Pągów may refer to the following places:
Pągów, Radomsko County in Łódź Voivodeship (central Poland)
Pągów, Rawa County in Łódź Voivodeship (central Poland)
Pągów, Opole Voivodeship (south-west Poland)